(born February 24, 1968) is a Japanese softball player who played as a Right field in the 1996 Summer Olympics and then the Pinch Runner in the 2000 Summer Olympics (except for the first game against Cuba, where she played in 2nd Base). She won the silver medal for Japan in 2000.

References

Japanese softball players
Living people
Softball players at the 2000 Summer Olympics
Olympic softball players of Japan
Olympic silver medalists for Japan
Softball players at the 1996 Summer Olympics
1968 births
Olympic medalists in softball
Asian Games medalists in softball
Softball players at the 1990 Asian Games
Softball players at the 1998 Asian Games
Medalists at the 1990 Asian Games
Medalists at the 1998 Asian Games
Asian Games silver medalists for Japan
Medalists at the 2000 Summer Olympics
20th-century Japanese women